Adesmus bicolor is a species of beetle in the family Cerambycidae. It was described by Gahan in 1889.

References

Adesmus
Beetles described in 1889